Inspector Dawood Ibrahim, also known as IDI, is a 2016 Indian Malayalam Language dystopian action comedy film directed by Sajid Yahiya, who co-wrote the film with Arouz Irfan. It stars Jayasurya in the lead role with Sshivada, Joju George, and Sunil Sukhada playing supporting roles. The soundtrack and background score are composed by Rahul Raj. Sujith Sarang handles the cinematography, with editing by Shameer Muhammed.

IDI narrates the story of a rich man who has dreamt of being a police officer all his life and eventually works hard to become one. It was released in India on 12 August 2016. The film also had a Hindi dubbed release titled Fauladi Policewala. The plot is inspired by the 2007 Hollywood film "Hot Fuzz"

Plot
The story is about Dawood Ibrahim, a man from a wealthy family, who chooses to become an honest police officer to give back to his community. He is transferred to a poor town Kollanahalli, at the Kerala-Karnataka border as the inspector of the local police station. He finds the village to be remote and without any major crimes. Soon, he meets Appendix Pappy, who swallows every gold or valuables he steals and Vasu, Karthavu and Kaimal, who are local thieves. Dawood hatches a plan to get a transfer to another police station by telling the trio to steal money from the local bank and rendezvous with him at a secluded place.
Meanwhile, an armed robbery occurs at a bank in Mangalore led by Mr. X who manage to steal money, gold, and other priceless objects, which includes a priceless ruby belonging to the underworld don Akbar Ali. They plan to escape to Kollanahalli. Vasu's gang manage to steal the money ordered by Dawood, but betray him and take all the money for themselves, thinking that Dawood is trying to look good in the land. But Vasu and his gang accidentally crash into Mr. X's gang. As they try to help the latter, they discover the loot in Mr. X's van, and they take the loot and the men.
Dawood, with the help of Appendix Pappi, manages to track and nab all 6 members and discovers about Akbar Ali's involvement. After settling the issue of Vasu's robbery through a compromise, Dawood instigates Akbar to come for him. Akbar then kidnaps Dawood's father, his comrades at the police station and Mr. X's gang. Akbar asks for his ruby to be delivered in return for sparing their lives. Dawood and Vasu's gang deliver the box, but it is found to be empty. Vasu and his gang help Dawood out, and finally, Dawood kills Akbar.
Dawood confesses that the ruby is lost and its whereabouts are unknown. It's revealed that the ruby was swallowed by Appendix Pappi. On being asked whether he knows where his next posting is, Dawood imagines being posted in Pakistan facing Dawood Ibrahim, the underworld don.

Cast

Production

Development 
In early January 2015, actor Sajid Yahiya announced his debut as a director. Asif Ali, who was cast in the lead, announced that he will produce the film under his production banner Adam's World of Imagination, but when he left the project, Ajaz Ibrahim and Arun signed to produce the film under Magic Lantern Productions. Filming scheduled to start in March 2015.

Casting and crew
Sajid kept the lead role of the film in secret. Only hinting that a young actor from the industry will be the lead. In June 2015 the crew announced Asif Ali in the lead, but in March 2016 reports said that Asif Ali will be replaced, afterwards reports confirmed that Jayasurya is the new lead playing Dawood Ibrahim. In March 2016 Sshivada signed to play the female lead. Her role is Nita a bank employee. She also had a significant role in the whole stunts of the film. The film marks the second collaboration of Jayasurya and Sshivada after Su..Su...Sudhi Vathmeekam (2015). Sajid chose Sooraj Harris to play a minor role, he described it as a "stylish role", he was inappropriate for a Malayali look and was dismissed from some films due to his North Indian look but according to him his role in IDI is very perfect and suitable for him. Unni P. Rajan who mostly act in comedy roles signed to do a throughout antagonist role, he assumes the role of a robber in it. Joju George and Sunil Sukhada were signed to play vital roles.

Sajid chose Rahul Raj and Praveen Varma as the film's music composer and costume designer. Stunts for the film was choreographed by Action G who attended with Peter Hein., while Shameer Muhammed was designated for film editing.

Release and reception 
IDI was released on 12 August 2016 and the film crossed  2 crore within three days in Kerala.

Music

The film score and soundtrack were composed, arranged and produced by Rahul Raj. The soundtrack was released by Eros Music.

Track listing

Malayalam version (Original)

Hindi version (Dubbed)

References

External links
 

2016 films
2016 action comedy films
2010s Malayalam-language films
2016 masala films
Films set in Karnataka
Fictional portrayals of police departments in India
Indian action comedy films
Films scored by Rahul Raj
Indian police films
2010s police procedural films
2016 comedy films